Prosecco is a village near the city of Trieste, Italy. It is best known for giving the name to the wine Prosecco.

Name
Prosecco was attested in written sources in 1308 as Prossecho (and as Prosec in 1372, Prossegk in 1421, and Proseck and Prosseck in 1494). The name is of Slovene origin, derived from the dialect common noun prosek 'path cut through the woods' (cf. standard Slovene proseka, standard Serbian/Croatian is prosek). The wine Prosecco was named after the village, and this wine name was later borrowed from Italian into Slovene and Croatian as prošek.

Population
The population in the central area of the locality is still mainly Slovene; it was 92% Slovene before the annexation of Austrian Littoral to Italy in 1920 and subsequent Italianization. The newer part of the locality known as Borgo San Nazario, built in the 1950s and 1960s, is mainly inhabited by Istrian Italians that left Istria after the end of World War II.

References

External links 
 

Frazioni of the Province of Trieste
Cities and towns in Friuli-Venezia Giulia